United Nations Security Council resolution 2081 was adopted in 2012.

See also
 List of United Nations Security Council Resolutions 2001 to 2100 (2011-2012)

References

External links
Text of the Resolution at undocs.org

2012 United Nations Security Council resolutions
United Nations Security Council resolutions concerning the International Criminal Tribunal for the former Yugoslavia
December 2012 events